Trinisaura is an extinct genus of ornithopod dinosaur known from the lower levels of the Late Cretaceous Snow Hill Island Formation (early Maastrichtian stage) of James Ross Island, Antarctica. It contains a single species, Trinisaura santamartaensis.

Discovery and naming 
The species was in 2013 named by Rodolfo Aníbal Coria e.a. The generic name honours the geologist Trinidad Diaz. The specific name refers to the Santa Marta Cove site where the specimen was in 2008 found by Coria and Juan José Moly. That same year, the find was reported in the scientific literature.

Phylogeny 
The cladogram below follows Coria et al., 2013 phylogenetic analysis. Trinisaura is found to be an ornithopod, however the inclusion of Thescelosaurus neglectus is necessary to determine whether it is a basal iguanodont.

In 2015, it along with several other Patagonian and Antarctic ornithopods was found to be a part of the basal group of iguanodonts, Elasmaria.

Cladogram based in the phylogenetic analysis of Rozadilla et al., 2015:

Description
Trinisaura lived approximately 83 to 72 million years ago during the Late Cretaceous period. It was likely bipedal, and relied on speed and agility to avoid predators.

References 

Ornithopods
Campanian life
Dinosaurs of Antarctica
Late Cretaceous dinosaurs
Fossils of Antarctica
Fossil taxa described in 2013
Taxa named by Rodolfo Coria
Ornithischian genera